El Reno Renardo is a humoristic heavy metal-band from Spain. The main theme of the lyrics of "El Reno Renardo" are daily situations narrated in a humorous way, being some songs principal objective the social critique.

Many of their songs are parodies or demos of well known songs of pop, rock or metal, whereas others are totally original (both the lyrics and the instrumental part).

History 

This started as an online project in solitary by Jevo (Soulitude, ex-Valhalla) in 2006. After having tried and failed a similar project of humoristic heavy metal named Metalcrilator with members of Valhalla, Jevo decided to do it by his own under the name El Reno Renardo.
 
He recorded the first free online LP in which he played guitars, bass, vocals and programmed the keyboards and the drums, being still a one-man project. Jevo invented a story, a formation and a location, which made people think that it was a real band.

He decided to record a second album entitled El Reno Renardo y el Reino De La Cagalera De Bisbal. It exceeded expectations.

El Reno Renardo was first created with the intention of being a studio project, but after being quite successful on the Internet, Jevo decided to recruit a line-up with old members of Valhalla for a first show.

Since then, El Reno Renardo have been a band.

Discography 

This band has published the following albums.

El Reno Renardo (2007) 

01. Cipote Ancho
02. No quiero ir al Gym
03. El Reno Renardo
04. Imbécil
05. Camino Moria
06. Yonkis Sobre Ruedas
07. Espera Farru Que Me Quito
08. Doctor Luis
09. Ni Una Sola Parada
10. Imagina
11. Mierda
12. Toroturadores
13. Zapping (Part I)

El Reno Renardo y El Reino de la Cagalera de Bisbal (2008) 
01. Renux Renardi
02. Cambio Radical
03. Hasta La Polla
04. Ctrl+Alt+Supr
05. El Bogavante
06. Carrockñeros del Rock
07. El Bardo Bastardo (In the Forest)
08. Crecí en los Ochenta
09. Zapping (Part II)
10. Cien Idiotas
11. Tu hamster
12. Fiesta Palangana
13. Vomito
14. Amamos la Birra
15. Trilorgía. Día 1: Despiporre
16. Trilorgía. Día 2: Secuelas
17. Trilorgía. Día 3: Urgencias
18. Outro: El Punky Perroflauta que tocaba la Canción del Equipo A y fue Ejecutado por Luke Skywalker

El Improperio Contraataca (2010) 
01. Intro Darth Gayer
02. Subnorman
03. Mi Casa
04. Mis Colegas
05. Señoras
06. Todos Contra el Canon
07. Entre Dos Piernas
08. En el Nardo
09. Opus Deiman
10. Con las manos en la Grasa
11. El Abuelo Batallitas y el Nieto Repelente
12. La Navaja del Trueno Inmortal
13. Enterradme en Media Markt
14. De Bilbao
15. Restos de Joaquín
16. Subnormercado
17. Subnormix

Babuinos del Metal (2013) 
01. Típica Intro
02. Game Over
03. No Hay Huevos
04. Majestad
05. Dios Del Balompié
06. Americano
07. Violenta Revolución
08. Festival
09. Leia
10. Fibergran
11. Orcos De Mordor
12. Hipihopo
13. Preludio al dolor
14. Qué Dolor
15. Te Das Queen
16. Mongomix

Meriendacena Con Satán (2016) 
01. Que empiece ya
02. 
03. Meriendacena medieval
04. Vinagre
05. El as de oros
06. Ampluger
07. Facebook
08. Puñoterapia
09. Telepasión
10. Busque y compare
11. Cagar anzuelos
12. Mi número, Juan Luis
13. Todo seta
14. Retromix
15. Euskal txupifesta
16. Tutti frutti summer love

Hostiopatia (2018) 
01. Intruder
02. Compañero de Piso
03. La Gente es Imbécil
04. Sanotes
05. Conspiranoid
06. Eres Trve
07. Qué Has Tomao
08. Cinta Americana
09. Cafelitos
10. Cumpleaños Feliz
11. Forfait
12. Huele mi Ombligo
13. Ofender
14. El Megalodón
15. Idiomix

Rarezas Raras (2020) 
01. Intrillo
02. Crecí En Los 90
03. Hasta La Polla 2020
04. Retrakermix
05. El Bardo Bastardo (Power Edition)
06. Facebook (Mongodance Edition)
07. La Navaja Del Trueno Immortal (Orquestal)
08. Orcos De Mordor (Ampluger)
09. Meriendacena Medieval (Ampluger)
10. No Quiero Ir Al Gym (Live Barcelona)
11. Tu Hamster (Live Bilbao)
12. Camino Moria (Live Itxura Studios)
13. Mis Colegas (Remix)
14. Señoras (Remix)
15. Festival (Remix)
16. Cuñaos
17. Hellrule Main Theme

El Mundo Se Va A La Mierda (2021) 
1.	Intro: El Reno, El Feo y El Malo		 
2.	El Mundo Se Va A La mierda		 
3.	Lo Puto Peor		 
4.	Spoilerman		 
5.	Puretas Del Caribe		 
6.	C.L.H.P.D		 
7.	Ojo Cuidao		 
8.	Nos Comen Los Monguers		 
9.	Sueco		 
10. La Solitaria		 
11. Mamarrachos		 
12. Esto No Es Disney		 
13. Malote		 
14. Madre		 
15. Bobomix

References

External links
 

Spanish heavy metal musical groups
Spanish rock music groups
Spanish power metal musical groups
People from Getxo